"One by One" is a song by American singer Cher. Written by Anthony Griffiths of English rock band the Real People, it had initially been recorded by the band as a single in 1987, when they were signed to Polydor Records and called Jo Jo and the Real People. In 1989, Irish singer Johnny Logan recorded a cover for his album Mention My Name.

Cher recorded another version of "One by One" several years later for her twenty-first studio album, It's a Man's World (1995). Production on her version was helmed by English producer Stephen Lipson.  The song served as the album's second European single following her rendition of the Marc Cohn song "Walking in Memphis." First released on January 8, 1996, by Reprise Records and WEA, it received a warm chart reception, reaching the top 10 in Hungary, the United Kingdom, and on a composite European Hit Radio Top 40.

For the United States and Canada, a new version of the song was produced by Sam Ward. This version was issued as the first single on May 21, 1996, and enjoyed success on their adult contemporary charts. A third version was released on the US maxi-single, with the Ward version altered to include a middle-8 performed by Melle Mel. Cher is credited as a composer on the US edition of It's a Man's World, but BMI lists only Griffiths.

Background
In 1987, Liverpool-based musician Anthony Griffiths penned the song for his band, Jo Jo and the Real People, who later shortened their name to the Real People. The band released "One by One" as an independent single in the late 1980s on Polydor Records. Irish singer Johnny Logan recorded "One by One" for his 1989 album Mention My Name.

Chart performance
For Cher, although "Walking in Memphis" was chosen as the first single, "One by One" proved to be more successful in the United Kingdom, when it charted at number seven. In the United States, the single performed moderately on the Billboard Hot 100, reaching number 52, but was a big hit on Billboards Adult Contemporary, Hot Dance Club Play and Hot Dance Singles Sales charts.

Critical reception
Jose F. Promis from AllMusic was positive by calling the song "irresistible, mid-tempo soul". Larry Flick from Billboard wrote, "Cher makes her Reprise debut with a summery jeep pop ditty. She is virtually unrecognizable during the song's verses, which she delivers in a startingly soulful (and previously untapped) falsetto. By the time the chorus breaks in, you're hooked by the brain-embedding melody and a lyric that is as sweet as can be." Columnist for Dotmusic, James Masterton said it "is quite possibly one of the most pure pop tracks she has ever recorded." A reviewer from Music Week rated it three out of five.

Music video
The original music video for "One by One" was filmed and released in the United Kingdom, which follows the story of an unhappy couple who struggle with problems, but later make up when they realize how much they actually love each other. When the video was released in the United States it followed the same concept, but some scenes were added and others removed; the beginning was also much different, including animations that followed the beat of the song. A third video using the Junior Vasquez Vocal Edit was also released, due to the popularity of Vasquez's remix in clubs. Dan Rucks, also known as Dan-O-Rama, remixed the video by using a combination of both original videos.

Notable live performances
 Cher performed the song on the fifth leg of her The Farewell Tour. The Junior Vasquez Club Vocal Mix was sung as part of the "Love Medley".
 The song was performed in the US on the Late Show with David Letterman in 1996.

Track listings

 UK and Australian CD single
 "One by One" – 5:03
 "If I Could Turn Back Time" – 3:59
 "It's a Man's Man's Man's World" – 4:37

 UK 12-inch single
 "One by One" (Junior's Club Vocal) – 8:45
 "Walking in Memphis" (Shut Up and Dance vocal mix) – 5:08
 "Walking in Memphis" (Baby Doc Mix) – 7:34

 UK cassette single
 "One by One" – 5:03
 "It's a Man's Man's Man's World" – 4:37

 European maxi-CD single
 "One by One" – 5:03
 "One by One" (Junior Vasquez Mix) – 8:45
 "If I Could Turn Back Time" – 3:59
 "It's a Man's Man's Man's World" – 4:37

 US 7-inch single
 "One by One" (album version) – 4:06
 "I Wouldn't Treat a Dog (The Way You Treated Me)" – 3:34

 US CD and cassette single
 "One by One" (album version) – 4:06
 "I Wouldn't Treat a Dog (The Way You Treated Me)" – 3:34
 "One by One" (original UK album version) – 5:03

 US and Australian maxi-CD single
 "One by One" (with Melle Mel) – 4:06
 "I Wouldn't Treat a Dog (The Way You Treated Me)" – 3:35
 "One by One" (Junior Vasquez club vocal mix) – 8:45
 "One by One" (Junior Vasquez club dub) – 7:22
 "One by One" (X Beat Mix) – 7:36
 "One by One" (X Beat Dub) – 7:36

 US 12-inch single
 "One by One" (Junior Vasquez club vocal mix) – 8:45
 "One by One" (Junior Vasquez club dub) – 7:22
 "One by One" (with Melle Mel) – 4:06
 "One by One" (X Beat Mix) – 7:36
 "I Wouldn't Treat a Dog (The Way You Treated Me)" – 3:35

Charts

Weekly charts

Year-end charts

Release history

Notes
1.Cher is credited as composer on the U.S. edition of the album It's a Man's World.

References

External links
 Official Cher site
 

1987 songs
1987 singles
1996 singles
Johnny Logan (singer) songs
Cher songs
Song recordings produced by Stephen Lipson
Songs written by Cher
Reprise Records singles
Warner Music Group singles